The following units and commanders of the Paraguayan army and the army of the Triple Alliance took part in the Battle of Curupayty on September 22, 1866.

Paraguayan Army
General José E. Díaz

Triple Alliance Army
Commander-in-chief Bartolomé Mitre

Brazilian I Corps
General Antonio Paranhos, Viscount of Porto Alegre

Argentine I Corps
General Wenceslao Paunero

Argentine II Corps
General Emilio Mitre

Sources
 Munoz, Javier Romero. "The Guerra Grande: The War of the Triple Alliance, 1865–1870", in Strategy & Tactics, No. 245 (August/September 2007). .

Orders of battle